Lindsay Sloane Leikin-Rollins (born August 8, 1977) is an American actress. She is known for playing Valerie Birkhead on Sabrina the Teenage Witch (1997–99) and Emily in The Odd Couple (2015–17). She has also starred in films such as Bring It On (2000), Over Her Dead Body (2008), She's Out of My League (2010), The Other Guys (2010), Horrible Bosses (2011), and its sequel Horrible Bosses 2 (2014).

Life and career
Lindsay Sloane Leikin was born on Long Island, New York, the daughter of Renée, a children's librarian, and Joey Leikin, a sales manager. She was raised in a Jewish family.

After moving to Los Angeles, Sloane signed with an agent at the age of eight. Her mother once drove her to an audition through the 1992 LA Riots. Her first recurring television role was as Alice Pedermeir on The Wonder Years from 1991 to 1993. She played Zoey Miller for seven episodes on the short-lived NBC sitcom Mr. Rhodes. She later played Valerie Birkhead on Sabrina the Teenage Witch from 1997 to 1999, and starred in Sabrina Down Under, a spinoff movie to the series as a different character, a mermaid named Fin. Sloane joined the casts of the short-lived series Grosse Pointe and The Stones. She auditioned unsuccessfully for many roles in a number of television shows including Blossom and Full House.

Sloane also appeared in episodes of Dharma & Greg, My So-Called Life, That '70s Show, The West Wing, Entourage, Greg the Bunny, How I Met Your Mother, The League, and Psych. Sloane was featured in the seventh season of Weeds, playing Maxeen, a character who hires Silas for a modeling gig and dates Andy. Most recently, she appeared in the main cast of the CBS sitcom The Odd Couple as Emily.

Her film résumé includes roles in Bring It On, Exposed, The In-Laws, Nancy Drew, Sabrina Down Under, Over Her Dead Body, She's Out of My League, The Other Guys and The Accidental Husband. She voiced the older sister in Why, Charlie Brown, Why?. As well as a guest role as Stephanie in Mr. Sunshine, Sloane also appears in the movie Horrible Bosses as Charlie Day's character's fiancée Stacy and in the 2011 movie A Good Old Fashioned Orgy.

Personal life
In 2004, Sloane married Dar Rollins, an agent for International Creative Management. The couple have two daughters.

Filmography

Film

Television

Video games

References

External links
 

1977 births
20th-century American actresses
21st-century American actresses
Living people
People from Long Island
Actresses from New York (state)
American child actresses
American film actresses
American television actresses
Jewish American actresses
21st-century American Jews